H. D. Vidusha Lakshani (born 28 December 1996) is a Sri Lankan athlete specialising in the triple jump.

She was born 28 December 1996 in Negombo, Western Province. She attended Newstead Girls College.

In 2018, she became the national triple jump champion with a jump of 13.64m. She has also medalled in the 2016 South Asian Games and other events. , she was ranked 60th in the world in women's triple jump, and had earlier held 41st place for one week. 

She won bronze medal in the Asian Athletics Championships 2019 held in Doha, Qatar, and dedicated the medal to the memory of friends and teachers who had died in the attack at St Sebastian's Church, Negombo, in the 2019 Sri Lanka Easter bombings.

References

1996 births
Living people
Sri Lankan female triple jumpers
South Asian Games medalists in athletics